The British Fencing Championships are held annually to determine the British champion. The Championships are currently held at the English Institute of Sport, Sheffield. 

The championships were not held during World War I, World War II and in 2020 due to the COVID-19 pandemic.

Past winners

Men's Foil

Men's Epee

Men's Sabre

Women's Foil

Women's Epee

Women's Sabre

References

Fencing competitions in the United Kingdom